Cathal Maenmaighe (died 745) was the 19th King of Uí Maine.

Cathal appears to have taken his name from Trícha Máenmaige.

During his reign, the following events occurred in Connacht and Ireland

 739 - "The sea cast ashore a whale in Boirche, in the province of Ulster. Every one in the neighbourhood went to see it for its wondrousness. When it was slaughtered, three golden teeth were found in its head, each of which teeth contained fifty ounces. Fiachna, son of Aedh Roin, King of Ulidia, and Eochaidh, son of Breasal, chief of Ui Eathach Iveagh, sent a tooth of them to Beannchair, where it remained for a long time on the altar, to be seen by all in general."
 742 - "Comman of Ross, who was Abbot of Cluain Mic Nois, and eke a man full of the grace of God was he, died."
 743 - "Ships with their crews, were plainly seen in the sky this year."
 744 - "Cluain Fearta Brenainn (Clonfert) was burned."

Notes

References

 Annals of Ulster at CELT: Corpus of Electronic Texts at University College Cork
 Annals of Tigernach at CELT: Corpus of Electronic Texts at University College Cork
Revised edition of McCarthy's synchronisms at Trinity College Dublin.
 Byrne, Francis John (2001), Irish Kings and High-Kings, Dublin: Four Courts Press,

External links
 Commentary by Dan M. Wiley (The Cycles of the Kings Web Project)

People from County Galway
People from County Roscommon
745 deaths
8th-century Irish monarchs
Year of birth unknown
Kings of Uí Maine